The men's flyweight is a competition featured at the 2019 World Taekwondo Championships, and was held at the Manchester Arena in Manchester, United Kingdom on 15 and 16 May. Flyweights were limited to a maximum of 58 kilograms in body mass.

Medalists

Results
Legend
P — Won by punitive declaration
R — Won by referee stop contest

Finals

Top half

Section 1

Section 2

Bottom half

Section 3

Section 4

References
Draw
Results

External links
Official website

Men's 58